Hino (written:  or  lit. "sun field" or "fire field") is a Japanese surname. Notable people with the surname include:

, Japanese video game designer and businessman
, Japanese soldier
, Japanese manga artist
, Japanese author
, Japanese inventor and aviation pioneer
, official wife of Ashikaga Yoshimasa
, Japanese bobsledder 
, Japanese manga artist
, Japanese figure skater
, Japanese voice actor
, Japanese graphics designer, game director and planner from Nintendo
, Japanese actor and singer
, Japanese football player
, Japanese international rugby union player
, Japanese jazz trumpet, cornet and flügelhorn player
, Japanese professional wrestler

Fictional characters
, a character in Smile Pretty Cure!
, the title character in Kamen Rider OOO
, a character from Crying Freeman
, a character from La Corda d'Oro
, the title character in MegaMan NT Warrior
 or Sailor Mars, a character in Sailor Moon
, the Yellow Ranger from the 1989 Super Sentai Series Turboranger
, characters from Amai Seikatsu

Japanese-language surnames